Sa (hiragana: さ, katakana: サ) is one of the Japanese kana, which each represent one mora. Both represent .  The shapes of these kana originate from 左 and 散, respectively.

Like き, the hiragana character may be written with or without linking the lower line to the rest of the character.

The character may be combined with a dakuten, changing it into ざ in hiragana, ザ in katakana, and za in Hepburn romanization.

Stroke order

Other communicative representations

 Full Braille representation

 Computer encodings

References

Specific kana